Anže Tomić is a Slovenian journalist best known for his podcast network Apparatus. He worked for Slovenian weekly magazine Monitor covering mobile technology. He is currently working as an online web editor at RTV Slovenija's Val 202 public radio
.
He is known under various nicknames, most known being "Podcast Sultan", "Big Bird", and many more.

References 

Slovenian journalists
Living people
Year of birth missing (living people)